Toric may refer to:

Mathematics 
relating to a torus
 Toric code
 Toric hyperkahler manifold
 Toric ideal
 Toric joint
 Toric manifold
 Toric orbifold
 Toric section
 Toric variety

Other uses 
 Toric lens, a type of optical lens
 Torić, a village in Bosnia and Herzegovina
 Toric Robinson (born 1986), Jamaican footballer

See also 
 Thoric, related to, or containing thorium